Əmirxanlı is a village and municipality in the Shabran Rayon of Azerbaijan. It has a population of 1,382.  The municipality consists of the villages of Əmirxanlı and Üzümlü.

References

Populated places in Shabran District